Upper South Waziristan District is district located in Dera Ismail Khan Division, Khyber Pakhtunkhwa, Pakistan. The Upper South Waziristan District was created in 13 April 2022 by bifurcation of the South Waziristan District. with Spinkai Karzai as its capital.

Administration 
The district is divided into the following tehsils:

 Makin Tehsil
 Ladha Tehsil
 Serwekai Tehsil
 Tiarza Tehsil

See also
 Lower South Waziristan District

References

South Waziristan District
Districts of Khyber Pakhtunkhwa
2022 establishments in Pakistan